Sydney, the largest city in Australia, is home to 1,168 completed high-rise buildings, more than any other city in Australia. Of those completed or topped out, the entire city (including metropolitan suburbs) has 48 buildings that reach a height of at least , of which 17 reach a height of at least  – the second–highest number of skyscrapers in Australia, as well as a further 16 buildings rising to at least  in height currently under construction.

Although the tallest buildings in the city have historically been concentrated in the central business district and immediate surrounding areas such as Barangaroo and Ultimo, suburbs within the Sydney metropolitan area have all seen a substantial surge in the development of high rises and skyscrapers in recent years, with major satellite centres such as Chatswood, Parramatta, North Sydney, St Leonards and Macquarie Park all witnessing or playing host to the construction of skyscrapers rising above 150 metres. As a result, Sydney has the tallest building and most skyscrapers (reaching at least 150 metres or above) outside an inner city area or core in Australia.

Sydney was one of the first cities in Australia and internationally to welcome the introduction of skyscrapers and high-rise office blocks in the mid 20th century, alongside cities in the U.S., including New York City and Chicago.

History

19th century 
Sydney played host to Australia's first tallest building in 1824 with the construction of St James' Church. The Garden Palace likewise only held this title as tallest briefly, after its demise from a fire in 1882. Hence, the Sydney Town Hall once again became Sydney's tallest until 1891 with the completion of the General Post Office.

20th century 

Towards the end of the 19th century and throughout the beginning of the 20th century, advances in building technology and design coupled with rising urban land values meant that high rise buildings became an attractive proposition in Sydney. Designed by Spain, Cosh and Minnett, the building consisted of 14 floors and cost £100,000 to build, equivalent of approximately $1 million in today's money. This new wave of construction of taller buildings consequently raised concerns over fire risks, namely the inadequate firefighting resources of the period that failed to reach such heights. The fire in the 8 storey Anthony Hordern & Sons building in 1901, which resulted in the death of 5 people, was notably one of the first cases to raise such concerns. In 1907, Alfred Webb; the then Superintendent of the Sydney Metropolitan Fire Brigade, described how it was "a suicidal policy to allow buildings of 100 feet to go up. Our extension ladders rise to a height of 80 feet, and it might be possible to add another 10 feet to them; but the effectiveness of their working is materially decreased as the height is added to." Additionally, public backlash against increased heights also became apparent during this period, primarily stemming from sentiments that taller buildings did not match the aesthetic of Sydney's streetscape and that they would become a source of increased overcrowding and congestion. This restriction would go on to stunt the height of Sydney's buildings, lasting until 1957.

Despite these height restrictions, 1939 saw the completion of the AWA Tower, which finally surpassed the General Post Office's title as Sydney's tallest after 48 years.

1960s and 1970s 
With growing demand for office space, the abolition of the  height limit in 1957 saw a subsequent construction boom for taller buildings beginning in the late 50s through to the early 1960s. During this period, Sydney played host to the construction of various new towers that would subsequently stand as the tallest in the nation.

Following this, the 1970s saw Sydney continue its construction boom and status as the city with the nation's tallest buildings. This title was short-lived, with the completion of the Harry Seidler designed MLC Centre in 1977, which stood at a height of 228 metres, the first building in Australia to surpass .

1980s and 1990s 

21st century 
A  height restriction implementation persisted in Sydney's building regulations well into the early 2010s.

Sydney's most recent residential tower, 505 George Street, will rise 270 metres, comprising 80 stories much of it serviced apartments. As the tower penetrates Sydney Airport's Obstacle Limitation Surfaces (OLS) it will require an Aeronautical Impact assessment approval.

The current tallest building in Sydney, and the fourth tallest in Australia is Crown Sydney.

Tallest buildings 
All structures are measured to the highest architectural detail, including spires.

Note: Sydney Tower is not included as it is defined as a structure, as opposed to a building.

Skylines

Tallest buildings proposed, approved and under construction 

This is a list of 150m+ proposed, approved and under construction skyscrapers in Sydney.

Timeline of tallest buildings 
This list includes buildings that once stood as tallest in Sydney.

See also 

 List of tallest buildings in Chatswood
 List of tallest buildings in Parramatta
 List of tallest buildings in Australia
 List of tallest buildings and structures in Australia
 Buildings and architecture of Sydney
 List of tallest buildings in Oceania

References 

 Emporis (General database for Skyscrapers)

Sydney
Tallest